Cristian Servidei (born December 11, 1972 in Bagnacavallo) is a retired Italian professional football player.

He played in the Serie A in the 1994/95 season (3 games for Calcio Padova) and in the 1997/98 season (6 games for A.S. Roma).

1972 births
Living people
Italian footballers
Serie A players
Serie B players
Serie C players
S.P.A.L. players
Venezia F.C. players
Calcio Padova players
U.S. Lecce players
A.S. Roma players
Ternana Calcio players
U.S. Pistoiese 1921 players
S.S.D. Castel San Pietro Terme Calcio players
Association football defenders
Sportspeople from the Province of Ravenna
Footballers from Emilia-Romagna